Tina Cvetkovič (born 4 December 2000) is a Slovenian tennis player.

Cvetkovič has a career high WTA ranking of 596 in singles achieved on 13 September 2021. She also has a career high WTA ranking of 785 in doubles achieved on 21 June 2021.

Cvetkovič made her WTA main-draw debut at the 2021 Zavarovalnica Sava Portorož after receiving a wildcard for the doubles main draw.

ITF Circuit finals

Singles: 1 (1 runner–up)

Doubles: 3 (3 titles)

Notes

References

External links
 
 

2000 births
Living people
Slovenian female tennis players